The 1956 Labour Party deputy leadership election took place on 2 February 1956, after the resignation of sitting deputy leader Herbert Morrison. Morrison resigned after his heavy defeat in the leadership election in December 1955, but the party decided not to hold a deputy leadership election until the new year.

Candidates
Herbert Morrison resigned as Deputy Leader of the Labour Party after a humiliating third-place defeat behind the winner Hugh Gaitskell and the runner-up Aneurin Bevan in the 1955 Labour Party leadership election. During this contest the Labour Party was divided between Bevanite and Gaitskellite wings.
 Aneurin Bevan, former Minister of Labour and National Service, Member of Parliament for Ebbw Vale
 Jim Griffiths, former Secretary of State for the Colonies, Member of Parliament for Llanelli

Results

The day after the result was announced, the political correspondent of The Glasgow Herald reported that "Mr Griffiths's success was a foregone conclusion", but Bevan attracted a much higher vote than had been expected. He speculated that if Bevan could "keep his personal animosities under control, and restrain his tendency to quarrel with colleagues in public" he would be "a formidable contender" for the post of deputy leader if he were to challenge Griffiths the following year.

As a result of Bevan's performance, his rival Gaitskell appointed him to his Shadow Cabinet as Shadow Colonial Secretary. He also won the election as party treasurer over George Brown in October 1956. One month later, he was promoted to Shadow Foreign Secretary for his fierce denunciation of the Suez Crisis. Afterwards the Bevanites and the Gaitskellites would increasingly reconcile, and Bevan was elected unopposed in the next deputy leadership election after Griffiths' retirement in 1959.

Notes and references

1956
Labour Party deputy leadership election
Labour Party deputy leadership election
Labour Party deputy leadership election